The Tampa Bay Tritons were a professional roller hockey team based in Tampa, Florida, United States that played in Roller Hockey International for one season. Mark Messier was the owner of the club during its short existence. His older brother Paul Messier served as the team's head coach and general manager. The club played its home games at Expo Hall in Tampa where the NHL's Tampa Bay Lightning had previously played one season.

References

Roller Hockey International teams
Sports teams in Tampa, Florida
Sports clubs established in 1994
Sports clubs disestablished in 1994
1994 establishments in Florida
1994 disestablishments in Florida